Local councils (Hebrew: plural:  Mo'atzot Mekomiot / singular:  Mo'atza Mekomit, Arabic: plural: مجالس محليّة Majalis Mahaleea / singular: مجلس محلّي Majlis Mahalee) are one of the three types of local government found in Israel, the other two being cities and regional councils. There are 124 local councils in Israel.

Local councils should not be confused with local committees, which are lower-level administrative entities.

History
Local council status is determined by passing a minimum threshold, enough to justify operations as independent municipal units, although not large enough to be declared a city. In general this applies to all settlements of over 2,000 people.

The Israeli Interior Minister has the authority of deciding whether a locality is fit to become a municipal council (a city). The minister is then expected to listen to the wishes of the residents of the locality in question, who may wish the locality to remain a local council even after achieving the requirements for a city (e.g., Ramat HaSharon, which did not become a city until 2002 due to its residents wanting to preserve its image as a small town), or a part of a regional council despite having achieved the criteria for a local one. Local councils also have an important role in town planning.

The Union of Local Authorities in Israel (ULAI) is the umbrella organization of local councils in Israel. The union represents the local councils vis a vis the national government. ULAI was established in 1938, under the British Mandate, as the League of Local Councils.

See also
Regional council (Israel)
City council (Israel)
List of cities in Israel

References

External links
Local Government in Israel. The Knesset Lexicon of Terms. 2009
 Local Council Ordinance 

 
Subdivisions of Israel
Local Councils